Edda Buding (13 November 1936 – 15 July 2014) was a German tennis player of Romanian birth. She received the doubles gold medal at the 1968 Summer Olympics doubles demonstration event partnered with Helga Niessen Masthoff. Along with Yola Ramírez Ochoa, she was the runner-up in the 1961 U.S. Championships women's doubles event and with Robert Howe was the runner-up in mixed doubles at Wimbledon in 1961. She was the sister of Ingo Buding, a two-time junior singles champion at the French Championships, and Ilse Buding.

She won the 1961 U.S. Women's Clay Court Championships singles title after a three-sets victory in the final against Karen Hantze.

In 1964 she received the Silbernes Lorbeerblatt (Silver Laurel Leaf), the highest sports award in Germany.

Buding is the first opponent to play Chris Evert at the U.S. Open.  Evert won their 1971 match 6–1, 6–0.

Buding died in 2014 in Aalen, Germany.

Major career finals

Grand Slam mixed doubles (2 runner-ups)

Grand Slam doubles (1 runner-up)

Other doubles titles

Fed Cup final

References

External links
 
 
 

1936 births
Romanian people of German descent
Olympic tennis players of West Germany
Tennis players at the 1968 Summer Olympics
West German female tennis players
People from Timiș County
2014 deaths
Tennis players at the 1955 Pan American Games
Pan American Games competitors for Argentina